Kavi Shastri (born 19 February 1986 in London) is a British film and television actor.

Early life and education
Kavi Shastri was born into a Gujarati family in London, England. His family, including parents Kaushik, Geeta and his older brother Ravi, later moved to South Woodford, London. Shastri attended George Tomlinson Primary school in Leytonstone, East London, and studied at local dance and drama clubs. At the age of nine, he was enrolled into The Padmini Kolhapure School of Acting in London, and throughout his primary years performed at venues across London.

In 1997, Shastri started his studies at the Italia Conti Academy of Theatre Arts. As well as academic studies, he trained in Ballet, Tap Dancing, Jazz, Lyrical, Hip Hop, Musical Theatre and Drama. Whilst at school, Shastri had small roles in ITV's This Morning and BBC One's Holby City.  Kavi graduated into the Academy's College on a government scholarship in 2003. While attending college, he acted in three seasons of CBBC's hit drama show UGetMe and the British feature Film It Could Be You. As part of his work on the film, Shastri flew to India. Shastri graduated with a Bachelor of Arts in Performing Arts, and was presented with an award from the Academy for his achievement in Drama.

Personal life
Shastri married Australian Indian Sherryl Wiltshire in January 2012 in Mumbai, and they currently live in Mumbai, India.

Career
After leaving College, Shastri appeared on ITV's The Bill, and in British feature film Popcorn. In 2009 he moved to India and enrolled in Anupam Kher's Actor Prepares. After graduation, he acted in Imtiaz Ali's Hindi film Love Aaj Kal, where he met Vir Das. The pair returned to Mumbai to create India's first Comedy Company 'Weirdass Comedy', which presented stand up comedy shows and performance across India and worldwide, and wrote scripts for the Filmfare Awards, Zee Cine Awards and Stardust Awards.

In 2008, Shastri played the part of Rohan Mehra on the Indian television show YRF Television's Rishta.com which debuted on 3 January 2010 on Sony Entertainment Television. After four nominations at award shows, Shastri was named the best newcomer at the 10th Indian Telly Awards. Shastri then took on a role with YRF Television's Kismat, an adaptation of Kane and Able.

Shastri and Das performed together at Sophia Auditorium in late 2011, in the stand up comedy show Ashvin Gidwani's History of India.

Shastri shot his first two films Amit Sahni Ki List and Main aur Mr Riight back to back. Later, he took on a role in the 2013 Yash Raj Films' Aurangzeb.

In 2014, Shastri returned to London to shoot for Ameet Chana's directorial feature debut Jayden.

Filmography

Television

Films

References

External links 
 
 

1986 births
Living people
British male film actors
Male actors in Hindi cinema
British male television actors
Gujarati people
British male actors of Indian descent
British Hindus
People from Woodford, London